James T. Flynn (born September 25, 1944) is an American lawyer and retired politician.  He was the 40th Lieutenant Governor of Wisconsin, serving from 1983 to 1987.  Prior to that, he served ten years in the Wisconsin State Senate.

Biography

Flynn graduated from Pius XI High School in Milwaukee.  He earned a B.A. degree from Marquette University in 1970 and a J.D. degree from Marquette University Law School in 1973. He worked as a house painter and subsequently as a teacher, serving at nearby St. Rose of Lima School in Milwaukee. Flynn was elected to the Wisconsin State Senate as a Democrat in 1972, and was re-elected in 1976 and 1980.

He won the Democratic primary for Lieutenant Governor in September 1982 and went on to win election alongside Democratic gubernatorial candidate Tony Earl.  He held office from 1983 until 1987; In January 1983, he was appointed and simultaneously served as the Secretary of the Wisconsin Department of Development.  He did not run for re-election in 1986. After he left office, he retired from politics and took a job as a project development executive with American Medical Buildings.

Flynn ran for a judgeship on the Wisconsin Circuit Court in Milwaukee County in 1999, but was defeated by incumbent Judge John E. McCormick.

In 2003, he was appointed to the Wisconsin Labor and Industry Review Commission by Governor Jim Doyle, and he was reappointed as chairman in 2005.  His term expired in 2011.

Electoral history

Wisconsin Senate (1972, 1976, 1980)

Wisconsin Lieutenant Governor (1982)

| colspan="6" style="text-align:center;background-color: #e9e9e9;"| General Election, September 14, 1982

| colspan="6" style="text-align:center;background-color: #e9e9e9;"| Gubernatorial General Election, November 2, 1982

Wisconsin Circuit Court (1999)

| colspan="6" style="text-align:center;background-color: #e9e9e9;"| General Election, April 6, 1999

References

1944 births
Living people
Politicians from Milwaukee
Lawyers from Milwaukee
Lieutenant Governors of Wisconsin
Marquette University alumni
Marquette University Law School alumni
Democratic Party Wisconsin state senators
Wisconsin lawyers